Jade Aurora Moana MacRae (born 4 June 1979) is an Australian soul singer and the daughter of professional musicians Joy Yates and Dave MacRae. MacRae is best known for her top 40 singles MacRae "So Hot Right Now" and "Superstar", both released in 2005. In 2012, following her marriage to Australian hip hop artist Phrase, MacRae continued her musical career under the new moniker of Dune.

Biography

Early years
Jade Aurora Moana MacRae was born on 4 June 1979 into a musical family. MacRae's mother is respected session vocalist Joy Yates and her pianist father is Dave MacRae. MacRae grew up in the Northern Beaches of Sydney, Australia. The singer commenced learning the piano at the age of three years and the violin at the age of eight. MacRae studied at the 
Sydney Conservatorium of Music and engaged in musical projects with members of The Sleepy Jackson and Pnau.

After completing her Australian Higher School Certificate, MacRae began singing in a number of entertainment venues as well as singing in a band with Mahalia Barnes and supporting Renée Geyer and Jackie Orszaczky.

Through her association with Mahalia Barnes, MacRae attained further work as a backup singer with Jimmy Barnes and worked as a session musician with Australian electronic acts such as Disco Montego, Endorphin and Pnau.

2004–2006: Jade MacRae
Early in 2004, German dance producer Ian Pooley recruited MacRae to sing on the track "Heaven", together with Danni'elle Gaha. The song featured on the German dance charts.

MacRae signed a record contract with Michael Hegarty of Workstation Records and worked with a number of producers throughout 2004. In October 2004, MacRae released her debut solo single "You Make Me Weak" which peaked at number 46 on the ARIA Charts.

In February 2005, MacRae released "So Hot Right Now" which debuted and peaked at number 18 on the ARIA Charts. In September 2005, MacRae released her debut self-titled album which peaked at number 61 on the ARIA Charts. The album's third single "Superstar" peaked at number 32 on the ARIA Charts.

MacRae performed the Australian national anthem "Advance Australia Fair" at the World Cup qualifying match, between Australia and Uruguay, at Sydney's Stadium Australia venue.

At the ARIA Music Awards of 2006, MacRae's was nominated for two ARIA Award nominations; ARIA Award for Best Urban Album and ARIA Award for Best Female Artist.

2007–2011: Get Me Home

In 2007, MacRae performed an hour-long set prior to the Asian Football Confederation (AFC)'s third and fourth Asian Cup quarter final matches in Sydney, Australia. The 2007 Asian Cup was the first time that Australia participated in the competition.

In mid-2007, MacRae toured Australia as part of the Broad show, performing alongside Deborah Conway, New Buffalo, Anne McCue, and Abbe May.

In September 2007, MacRae released "In the Basement", the lead single from her second studio album. The song peaked at number 60 on the ARIA Chart. After several delays, MacRae's second album Get Me Home was released in October 2008, together with the album's second single "I Wanna Be in Love". The album failed to enter any music charts. In a 2012 interview MacRae confessed that the lack of the success of the album impacted her confidence. MacRae said she was "shell-shocked after that didn't work out. It was a hard thing to recover from."

2012–2017: Dune
In 2012, MacRae contributed vocals to the soundtrack of the Australian film The Sapphires (alongside Jessica Mauboy and Lou Bennett, Juanita Tippens and Darren Percival), in addition to the fourth album of Australian artist Kevin Mitchell (recording under his "Bob Evans" pseudonym), Familiar Stranger.

In September 2012 MacRae assumed a new musical pseudonym Dune saying "The music I'm making is definitely more alternative, so I thought it needed its name, its identity and personality". In July 2012, Dune released the song "Shoestring" together with a music video.

Dune released the EP Oh Innocence on 14 March 2013, and MacRae revealed the Dune recordings were self-funded, self-produced, and self-released. MacRae's live band for the Dune project consists of a bassist and drummer, Luke Hodgson and Leigh Fisher (both from the band Gypsy and the Cat), and the group was invited to play at the 2013 Great Escape Festival held annually in Brighton, UK. 

In 2013 in an interview with the Time Out media group, MacRae provided an insight into the response from fans of her previous work under the "Jade MacRae" title "I think some people are quite disappointed in the new direction – some people on the urban scene can be quite staunch ... It's amazing how short people's memories are although. A lot of the people I deal with in media have no recollection of me ... There's no culture these days in the mainstream really – the idea of discovering an artist, getting all their albums, and getting obsessed with them is dying out. It still exists to some extent in indie bands and left-of-center music."

2018–present: Handle Me with Care
In 2018 MacRae announced she had returned to the studio and was working on a new album. The album was released on 12 June 2020 under the title Handle Me with Care. It was proceeded by the singles "Up Above Your Head", "I Choose Love" and "Midnight Air".

Other media

MacRae signed on to participate in the Australian celebrity television singing show, It Takes Two in 2006, and was partnered with Australian cricket player Michael Bevan—the pair was eliminated on 2 July 2006. MacRae returned to It Takes Two in May 2007, and was partnered with Home and Away'''s Bobby Morley (Morley appeared in the music video for MacRae's song "In The Basement" later that year). Morley and MacRae were eliminated on 12 June 2007. In 2008, MacRae returned to the television show for a third time, and was partnered with actor Paul O'Brien—the pair were eliminated in the eighth week of the season.

MacRae briefly acted in the co-host role for Sydney's Edge 96.1 radio station, and appeared several times on the Australian musical comedy/quiz shows Spicks And Specks and RocKwiz''.

Personal life
In August 2011, MacRae married hip hop artist Phrase, based in Melbourne, Australia, after dating since 2008.

Discography

Albums

Extended plays

Singles

Awards and nominations

References

External links 
 
 
 

1979 births
Living people
APRA Award winners
Australian people of Scottish descent
Australian soul singers
New Zealand Māori musicians
Sydney Conservatorium of Music alumni
21st-century Australian women singers
Australian women rappers